Phoebus Film or Phoebus-Film was a German film production and distribution company active during the silent era. It was one of the medium-sized firms established during the early boom years of the Weimar Republic. It had a distribution agreement with the American studio MGM.

In 1927 the studio became involved in major controversy during the Lohmann Affair, when it emerged that the company had secretly been granted a large sum from the German Navy Department geared toward military propaganda and support of rearmament at a time when this was forbidden by the Treaty of Versailles. The ensuing scandal led to a political crisis in the Weimar Republic and the resignation of Otto Gessler as Defence Minister.

The company went bankrupt in the wake of the scandal. In 1928 the Munich-based Bavaria Film bought up the remaining assets of the company  Its former production chief Ernst Hugo Correll was appointed as the new head of Germany's largest company UFA.

References

Bibliography
 Hardt, Ursula. From Caligari to California: Erich Pommer's life in the International Film Wars. Berghahn Books, 1996.
 Kreimeier, Klaus. The Ufa Story: A History of Germany's Greatest Film Company, 1918-1945. University of California Press, 1999.
 Petley, Julian. ''Capital and Culture: German Cinema, 1933–45. British Film Institute, 1979.

German film studios
Film production companies of Germany
Film distributors of Germany